In music, Op. 134 stands for Opus number 134. Compositions that are assigned this number include:

 Prokofiev – Sonata for Solo Cello
 Schumann – Introduction and Concert Allegro
 Shostakovich – Violin Sonata